Laurel Grove Cemetery is a cemetery located in midtown Savannah, Georgia. It includes the original cemetery for whites (now known as Laurel Grove North) and a companion burial ground (called Laurel Grove South) that was reserved for slaves and free people of color. The original cemetery has countless graves of many of Savannah's Confederate veterans of the American Civil War.  The cemetery was dedicated in 1852.  The lawyer and poet Henry Rootes Jackson delivered the dedication address.

With lush plantings and beautifully carved stones, both sections of Laurel Grove Cemetery resemble more famous Victorian-era graveyards such as Green-Wood in New York City and Père Lachaise in Paris.  The south section of the cemetery was added to the National Register of Historic Places (NRHP) in 1978 and the north section was added to the NRHP in 1983.

History
Although planned as early as 1818, Laurel Grove first opened for burials in 1853. Administrators of Laurel Grove have recently begun an ambitious plan to computerize the cemetery's burial records.

References

External links
 
 
 
 
 Laurel Grove South Cemetery historical marker

Cemeteries in Savannah, Georgia
Protected areas of Chatham County, Georgia
1853 establishments in Georgia (U.S. state)
National Register of Historic Places in Savannah, Georgia